The Call of the Sea or The Oceans Are Calling is a 1951 East German drama film directed by Eduard Kubat and starring Hans Klering, Käte Alving and Evamaria Bath. A defector to West Germany returns to the East having become disillusioned by capitalist society.

It was made by the state-owned DEFA studio. The film's art direction was by Artur Günther.

Cast
 Hans Klering as Ernst Reinhardt
 Käte Alving as Ida Reinhardt, dessen Frau
 Evamaria Bath as Gisela Reinhardt, beider Kind
 Helmut Ahner as Walter Reinhardt - beider Kind
 Herbert Richter as Franz Nölte
 Magdalene von Nußbaum as Emmi Nölte, seine Frau
 Viola Recklies as Inge Nölte, beider Kind
 Hans-Joachim Martens as Heinz Nölte, beider Kind
 Günther Ballier as Fischer Thomsen
 Fredy Barten as Erich Pascholle
 Albrecht Bethge as Auktionator
 Elfie Dugall as Trude
 Martin Flörchinger as Kurt Schöller
 Harry Gillmann
 Oskar Höcker as Fischmakler
 Kurt Jung-Alsen
 Herbert Kiper as Bürgermeister Gubitz
 Hans-Erich Korbschmitt
 Alfred Maack as Klüterbau
 Hans Maikowski as Hans Freese
 Willi Narloch as Richard Schweikert
 Wolfgang-Erich Parge as Karl Lamprecht
 Gustav Püttjer as Hein Bachmann
 Ursula Rank as Käte Flemming
 Johannes Schmidt as Heinrich Stüber
 Walter B. Schulz as Wilhelm Lehmann
 Friedrich Siemers as Dieter Specht
 Friedrich Teitge as Regierungsbeamter
 Christine von Trümbach
 Siegfried Weiß
 Teddy Wulff

References

Bibliography 
 Liehm, Mira & Liehm, Antonín J. The Most Important Art: Eastern European Film After 1945. University of California Press, 1977.

External links
 

1951 films
1951 drama films
East German films
1950s German-language films
German drama films
Films about fishing
Films set in the Baltic Sea
Cold War films
German black-and-white films
1950s German films